George Edward Winkelman (1865–1960) was a professional baseball player. He appeared in one game for the 1886 Washington Nationals of the National League. He played in the minors as late as 1895.

In his only major league game, he equalled the record set by Mike Corcoran for the most wild pitches by a pitcher in their first game, with five. He pitched the first six innings of the game, giving up 11 runs on 12 hits and five walks and taking the loss. He was moved to right field to finish the game.

References

External links

Major League Baseball pitchers
Major League Baseball outfielders
Washington Nationals (1886–1889) players
Lynchburg (minor league baseball) players
Minneapolis Millers (baseball) players
Milwaukee Brewers (minor league) players
Milwaukee Creams players
Hartford (minor league baseball) players
Lebanon (minor league baseball) players
Scranton Coal Heavers players
Baseball players from Washington, D.C.
19th-century baseball players
1865 births
1960 deaths